"The Moonshiner" is a folk song with disputed origins. It is catalogued as Roud Folk Song Index No. 4301. Some believe that the song originated in America, then was later made famous in Ireland, while others claim that it was the other way around. The Clancy Brothers stated on their recording that the song is of Irish origin, but again, this is disputed. Delia Murphy was singing it in Ireland from the late 1930s. However, its first American appearance was recorded in Carl Sandberg's 1927 The American Songbag, which credits the Combs family of Kentucky for the collection of the song going at least as far back as the turn of the century. The minor key arrangement is credited therein to Alfred George Wathall.

In 1963, Bob Dylan recorded "Moonshiner", which was released on The Bootleg Series Volumes 1-3 (Rare & Unreleased) 1961-1991. While this bears resemblance to the 1930s recordings of Henson and Kazee, both of those versions include the "I always stay sing single" segment not present in the Sandberg version or in Dylan's, and neither include Dylan's "World's just a bottle" segment which appears with Rolf Cahn's Folkways recording in 1959 and later in Van Ronk's (1964). 

The song has also been performed by Elliott Smith, Cat Power, Rumbleseat, Cast Iron Filter, Jalan Crossland, Peter Rowan, Railroad Earth, Bob Forrest, Roscoe Holcomb, Uncle Tupelo, Jeffrey Foucault, The Tallest Man On Earth, Tim Hardin, Charlie Parr, Punch Brothers, Redbird, Robert Francis, Scorpios, Dave Van Ronk, əkoostik hookah, Moriarty, Clay Parker & Jodi James, Lost Dog Street Band, David Bromberg,and Parsonsfield.

In the movie Deliverance, actor/musician Ronny Cox plays and sings the "religion when I die" stanza on his acoustic guitar around the first night's campfire.

Lyrics

(transcribed from Uncle Tupelo's version, from "March 16–20 - 1992".

I am a moonshiner
For 17 long years
And I spent all my money
On whiskey and beers

And I go to some hollow
And set up my still
If whisky don't kill me
Lord, I don't know what will

And I go to some barroom
To drink with my friends
Where the women they can't follow
To see what I spend

God bless them, pretty women
I wish they was mine
With breath as sweet as
The dew on the vine

Let me eat when I'm hungry
Let me drink when I'm dry
Two dollars when I'm hard up
Religion when I die

The whole world is a bottle
And life is but a dram
When the bottle gets empty
Lord, it sure ain't worth a damn

References

Ballads
Songs about alcohol
Year of song unknown
Bob Dylan songs
American folk songs